Blue and White is an album by guitarist Doug Raney recorded in 1983 and released on the Danish label, SteepleChase.

Reception 

Ken Dryden of AllMusic states "Because Doug Raney has recorded almost exclusively for European labels, he isn't as well known in his homeland, but his CDs are well worth exploring".

Track listing 
 "Blue and White" (Nisse Sandström) – 6:21
 "I Love You" (Cole Porter) – 7:11
 "Gingerbread Boy" (Jimmy Heath) – 9:39
 "Old Devil Moon" (Burton Lane, Yip Harburg) – 6:59
 "Old Folks" (Dedette Lee Hill, Willard Robison) – 5:46
 "Straight Street" (John Coltrane) – 9:18
 "Minority" (Gigi Gryce) – 7:28 Bonus track on CD reissue

Personnel 
Doug Raney – guitar
Ben Besiakov – piano
Jesper Lundgaard – bass
Aage Tanggaard – drums

References 

Doug Raney albums
1984 albums
SteepleChase Records albums